Hinewai Reserve is a private nature reserve on Banks Peninsula in New Zealand.

Description
Hinewai Reserve started off as a 109 ha block of farmland bought by the Maurice White Native Forest Trust in September 1987 and is now 1230 ha of gorse and regenerating native bush.

The reserve was completely forested in pre-human times but, as with much of Banks Peninsula, the forest cover was severely reduced, especially after European settlement. The transformation from open pasture and gorse to native vegetation has occurred rapidly. The reserve includes 20 walking tracks open to the public, including part of the Banks Peninsula Track.

The reserve is managed for the Trust by botanist Hugh Wilson, who hand-writes and illustrates a newsletter about the reserve, Pīpipi, which the Trust publishes several times a year.

One-third of the reserve was burnt on 13 July 2011, possibly due to a lightning strike. In 2017 the Hinewai newsletter reported that there was hardly anything noticeable left. The gorse regrew and so did 
native shrubs and trees

See also
Protected areas of New Zealand
Gorse in New Zealand

References

Further reading
Hugh Wilson, (2002) Hinewai: the journal of a New Zealand naturalist

External links
Hinewai website
Hinewai Reserve at Google Maps
Fools and Dreamers documentary 

Banks Peninsula
Protected areas of Canterbury, New Zealand